Aurelia Molins or Aurelia Florio (1582 – 1641) (known also as Celia) was an English midwife. She is known for being the daughter of the famous lexicographer John Florio.

Life
Her father was John Florio and her mother was Anna Soresollo, who died of plague between 1592 and 1593. Her father was a famous lexicographer and language tutor at the court of James I of England.  Aurelia Florio is thought to have been born in about 1582. Her siblings included Joane who was born in Oxford in 1585 and Edward who was born in 1588. A third daughter, Elizabeth, was born in 1589.

She was married before 1603 to the surgeon James Molins. He was apprenticed to William Clowes, surgeon to  Elizabeth I, and it is thought that Clowes introduced him to Aurelia. Aurelia was a midwife and was one of England's most celebrated midwives in the first part of the seventeenth century. The registers of St Andrew, Holborn, has shown that Aurelia Florio's handling of her patients was commemorated by the unusual name Aurelia being bestowed on girls she had delivered (ten more girls in the parish were also baptised with this name ending in 1639). Her skills showed that her knowledge of Latin, the language of medical texts, gave her expertises that very few women had at that time.
Meanwhile, Molins was caring for her own fifteen children who were born between 1605 and 1622. She was allowed to have her own armorial bearings on 22 August 1614. Her husband was awarded his on the following day. Her bearings were "azure, a heliotrope or issuing from a stalk sprouting out two leaves vert, in chief the sun in splendour". In 1625 her father died and she was by then his only child. His will discusses his debts but also mentions a gold ring that he leaves to his daughter and another diamond ring which is in the possession of Aurelia's husband.

She comes to notice as a midwife when she signed on 2 July 1634 an examination that had been made of ten women who were alleged to be witches. The women had been brought from Lancashire to be examined in London. The examination was organised by William Harvey who was a sceptic about the idea of witches. The document was also signed by nine other midwives and five surgeons including her husband. The examiners reported on the women's bodies and found that they had found nothing to support the allegation against the ten women. A later confession revealed that the accusations had been invented by a man and his son.

Molins was living with her son when she died a rich widow in London on 12 July 1641.

References

1582 births
1641 deaths
English surgeons
English midwives